Paraburkholderia diazotrophica is a gram-negative, catalase and oxidase-positive, aerobic, non-spore-forming, motile bacterium from the genus Paraburkholderia and the family Burkholderiaceae which was isolated from the nitrogen-fixing nodules on the roots of a Mimosa. Colonies of Paraburkholderia diazotrophica are yellow pigmented.

References

diazotrophica
Bacteria described in 2013